Elections to the Baseball Hall of Fame for 1969 followed the system reintroduced in 1968. The Baseball Writers' Association of America (BBWAA) voted once by mail to select from recent major league players and elected two, Roy Campanella and Stan Musial. The Veterans Committee met in closed sessions to consider executives, managers, umpires, and earlier major league players. It selected two players, Stan Coveleski and Waite Hoyt. A formal induction ceremony was held in Cooperstown, New York, on July 28, 1969, with Commissioner of Baseball Bowie Kuhn presiding.

BBWAA election
The BBWAA was authorized to elect players active in 1949 or later, but not after 1963; the ballot included candidates from the 1968 ballot who received at least 5% of the vote but were not elected, along with selected players, chosen by a screening committee, whose last appearance was in 1963. All 10-year members of the BBWAA were eligible to vote.

Voters were instructed to cast votes for up to 10 candidates; any candidate receiving votes on at least 75% of the ballots would be honored with induction to the Hall. The ballot consisted of 46 players; a total of 340 ballots were cast, with 255 votes required for election. A total of 2,604 individual votes were cast, an average of 7.66 per ballot.

Candidates who were eligible for the first time are indicated here with a dagger (†). The two candidates who received at least 75% of the vote and were elected are indicated in bold italics; candidates who have since been elected in subsequent elections are indicated in italics.

Schoolboy Rowe, Dixie Walker and Mort Cooper were on the ballot for the final time.

J. G. Taylor Spink Award 
H. G. Salsinger (1885–1958) received the J. G. Taylor Spink Award honoring a baseball writer. The award was voted at the December 1968 meeting of the BBWAA, and included in the summer 1969 ceremonies.

References

External links
1969 Election at www.baseballhalloffame.org

Baseball Hall of Fame balloting
Hall of Fame balloting